The 2016–17 North Carolina A&T Aggies men's basketball team represented North Carolina Agricultural and Technical State University during the 2016–17 NCAA Division I men's basketball season. The Aggies, led by Jay Joyner in his first full year as head coach, played their home games at the Corbett Sports Center in Greensboro, North Carolina as members of the Mid-Eastern Athletic Conference. They finished the season 3–29, 1–15 in MEAC play to finish in last place. They lost in the first round of the MEAC tournament to Maryland Eastern Shore.

Previous season
The Aggies finished the 2015–16 season 10–22, 7–9 in MEAC play to finish in a three-way tie for sixth place. They lost to Coppin State in the first round of the MEAC tournament.

Head coach Cy Alexander resigned on January 26, 2016. Assistant coach Jay Joyner took over on interim basis. On March 7, the interim tag was removed and Joyner was named head coach.

Preseason 
The Aggies were picked to finish seventh in the MEAC preseason poll. Sam Hunt was selected to the All-MEAC preseason first team.

Roster

Schedule and results

|-
!colspan=9 style=| Regular season

|-
!colspan=9 style=| MEAC tournament

References

North Carolina A&T Aggies men's basketball seasons
North Carolina
2016 in sports in North Carolina
2017 in sports in North Carolina